Ontonagon is a village in the Upper Peninsula of the U.S. state of Michigan. The population was 1,285 at the 2020 census. It is the county seat and only village of Ontonagon County.

The village is located within Ontonagon Township, at the mouth of the Ontonagon River on Lake Superior. Industry was centered on the Smurfit-Stone Container production facility at the river mouth until the plant closed in 2010.

Geography

Transportation

Major highways
 is a north–south highway with its northern terminus in downtown Ontonagon. The highway continues south into Wisconsin.
 is an east–west highway with its western terminus in Ontonagon. The highway can be used to access locations east of Ontonagon, including Houghton and Baraga.
 an east–west highway with its eastern terminus in Ontonagon. The highway can be used to access locations west of Ontonagon, including Porcupine Mountains Wilderness State Park.

Airport
The village is served by the Ontonagon County Airport (KOGM).

Railroads
Ontonagon was formerly the terminus of the Milwaukee Road Chippewa-Hiawatha.  While service ended in 1953, Ontonagon Station remains today. Railroads in Ontonagon have since been removed.

Demographics

2020 census

As of the census of 2020, there were 1,285 people residing in the village.

2010 census
As of the census of 2010, there were 1,494 people, 717 households, and 390 families residing in the village. The racial makeup of the village was 97.3% White, 0.1% African American, 0.7% Native American, 0.3% Asian, 0.2% from other races, and 1.5% from two or more races. Hispanic or Latino of any race were 1.2% of the population.

There were 717 households, of which 19.7% had children under the age of 18 living with them, 40.9% were married couples living together, 9.6% had a female householder with no husband present, 3.9% had a male householder with no wife present, and 45.6% were non-families. 41.1% of all households were made up of individuals, and 19.3% had someone living alone who was 65 years of age or older. The average household size was 1.99 and the average family size was 2.66.

The median age in the village was 51.1 years. 17.6% of residents were under the age of 18; 5.1% were between the ages of 18 and 24; 18.5% were from 25 to 44; 33.3% were from 45 to 64; and 25.5% were 65 years of age or older. The gender makeup of the village was 48.9% male and 51.1% female.

2000 census
At the census of 2000 there were 1,769 people, 768 households, and 450 families living in the village. The population density was 182.1/square kilometre; (472.0/square mile). There were 891 housing units at an average density of 91.7/square kilometre (237.7/square mile). The racial makeup of the village was 97.68% White, 0.00% African American, 0.73% Native American, 0.23% Asian, 0.00% Pacific Islander, 0.28% from other races, and 1.07% from two or more races. 0.85% of the population were Hispanic or Latino of any race. 25.9% were of Finnish, 20.6% German, 7.4% Polish, 6.4% French. 5.8% English and 5.6% Irish ancestry according to Census 2000.

There were 768 households, of which 24.3% had children under the age of 18 living with them, 45.3% were married couples living together, 8.6% had a female householder with no husband present, and 41.4% were non-families. 37.9% of all households were made up of individuals, and 19.8% had someone living alone who was 65 years of age or older. The average household size was 2.11 and the average family size was 2.76.

In the village, the population was spread out, with 20.5% under the age of 18, 4.2% from 18 to 24, 23.0% from 25 to 44, 25.0% from 45 to 64, and 27.2% who were 65 years of age or older. The median age was 47 years. For every 100 females, there were 91.7 males. For every 100 females aged 18 and over, there were 88.1 males.

The median income for a household in the village was $28,300, and the median income for a family was $35,804. Males had a median income of $36,964 versus $20,815 for females. The per capita income for the village was $16,293. 11.8% of the population and 6.5% of families were below the poverty line. 15.1% of those under the age of 18 and 10.0% of those 65 and older were living below the poverty line.

Climate
This climatic region is typified by large seasonal temperature differences, with warm to hot (and often humid) summers and cold (sometimes severely cold) winters.  According to the Köppen Climate Classification system, Ontonagon has a humid continental climate, abbreviated "Dfb" on climate maps.

Gallery

See also
 Independence (steamboat), which brought supplies and goods to this port during its early history

References

External links
Village of Ontonagon Official Website

Villages in Ontonagon County, Michigan
Villages in Michigan
County seats in Michigan
Populated places established in 1843
1843 establishments in Michigan
Michigan populated places on Lake Superior